Harold Alfred Blackmore (13 May 1904 – 1989) was an English professional footballer who played in the Football League for Exeter City, Bolton Wanderers, Middlesbrough, Bradford Park Avenue and Bury.

Personal life 
Blackmore was married with three sons and after retiring from football, he opened a butcher's shop.

Career statistics

Honours 
Bolton Wanderers

 FA Cup: 1928–29

References

1904 births
1989 deaths
English footballers
English Football League players
Exeter City F.C. players
Bolton Wanderers F.C. players
Middlesbrough F.C. players
Bradford (Park Avenue) A.F.C. players
Bury F.C. players
Footballers from Devon
Association football forwards
Association football inside forwards
English butchers
People from Mid Devon District
FA Cup Final players